Black Belt is a 1978 Indian Malayalam film, directed by Crossbelt Mani. The film stars Unnimary, Balan K. Nair, Kuthiravattam Pappu and Ravikumar in the lead roles. The film has musical score by Shyam.

Cast
Ravikumar 
Sudheer
Vincent
Unnimary 
Balan K. Nair 
Kuthiravattam Pappu 
Vijayalalitha

Soundtrack
The music was composed by Shyam and the lyrics were written by Bharanikkavu Sivakumar.

References

External links
 

1978 films
1970s Malayalam-language films